Can't Stay Away is the eleventh studio album by American rapper Too Short. It was released on July 13, 1999, via Jive Records, making it his eighth album on the label. The album received generally positive reviews from critics and was a commercial success, certified Gold on August 13, 1999, only a month after its release. This is Too Short's fourth consecutive album to reach the top of the US Top R&B/Hip-Hop Albums chart.

The album was preceded by the singles "Invasion of the Flat Booty Bitches" which rose to number 51 on Billboard Hot 100 chart in September 1998, and "More Freaky Tales" which hit number 3 on the Hot Rap chart in January 1999. A music video was produced for the song "Ain't No Bitches". "It's About That Money" with Sean "Puffy" Combs was released as a single to accompany the album in mid-1999, but it missed the Hot 100 by four places in August. The Village Voice called out "It's About That Money" and "Here We Go" as the best two songs on the album, the rest are described as Too Short's usual "trunk funk" style.

Track listing

Credits 
Credits for Can't Stay Away adapted from Allmusic.

 8Ball – Composer, Featured Artist
 Yaku Allen – Composer
 B-Legit - Composer, Featured Artist, Guest Artist, Performer
 Sonny B – Keyboards, Producer
 Badwayz – Performer, Primary Artist
 Ant Banks – Composer, Engineer, Keyboards, Mixing, Producer
 Quinton Banks - Producer (tracks 6, 8, 9, 17)
 Black – Keyboards (5)(tracks 6, 8, 9), Performer
 Quint Black – Composer, Performer, Primary Artist
 Al Block – Performer, Primary Artist
 Don "DJ Snake" Brown - Mixing
 Horace Brown – Guest Artist, Performer
 Larry Busacca – Photography
 Josh Butler – Engineer
 Harry Wayne "K.C." Casey – Composer
 George Clinton – Composer
 Tom Coyne – Mastering
 Mike D. – Composer, Engineer, Keyboards, Producer
 Jay Da Sinnusta – Harmonica
 Diamond D – Composer, Producer
 Daz Dillinger – Featured Artist, Performer
 Jermaine Dupri – Remixing
 E-40 – Composer, Featured Artist, Guest Artist, Performer
 8Ball and MJG – Guest Artist, Performer, Primary Artist
 Richard Finch – Composer
 Soopa Fly – Featured Artist
 G-Side – Primary Artist
 Nick Gamma – Art Direction
 Eric Gast – Engineer
 Seth Glassman – Composer
 Wellington "Tech" Gray – Engineer
 Xavier Hargrove – Composer
 Chaz Harper – Digital Editing
 Hellakilla – Primary Artist
 David Jackson – Composer
 Jay-Z – Composer, Featured Artist, Guest Artist, Performer

 Jazze Pha – Composer, Keyboards, Producer, Vocals (Background), Vocals (tracks 1, 2, 6, 7)
 Gerald Johnson – Composer
 K.B. – Additional Vocals
 Dennis Lambert – Composer
 Lil' Jon – Featured Artist, Performer, Producer
 Lil' Jon & the Eastside Boyz – Featured Artist
 Lil' Kim – Performer
 Craig Love – Guitar
 Andrew Lyn – Assistant Engineer, Mixing Assistant
 Jay Mac – Composer, Keyboards, Producer
 Juree Manning – Vocals (Background)
 Robin Mays – Engineer
 MJG – Composer, Featured Artist, Performer
 Mo-Suave – Producer
 Murda One – Performer, Primary Artist
 Kevin Parker – Engineer
 Charles Pettaway – Composer, Guitar
 Playa Playa – Performer, Primary Artist
 Brian Potter – Composer
 Puff Daddy – Featured Artist, Guest Artist, Performer
 Shabba Ranks – Featured Artist, Guest Artist, Performer
 Scarface – Composer, Featured Artist, Guest Artist, Performer
 Torrance Scott – Bass, Composer, Guitar, Guitar (Bass: tracks 6, 8, 15, 17)
 Erick Sermon – Composer, Keyboards, Producer, Programming
 Russell Simmons – Composer
 Slink Capone – Performer, Primary Artist
 Suege – Vocals (Background)
 Suge and Otis – Vocals (Background)
 T-Mix – Engineer
 Taj "Mahal" Tilghman – Composer, Drums, Engineer, Keyboards, Mixing, Producer
 Too $hort – Composer, Primary Artist
 Carlos Warlick – Engineer
 Dwayne Wiggins – Featured Artist, Guest Artist, Guitar, Performer
 Zu - Performer, Primary Artist

Charts

Weekly charts

Year-end charts

See also
 List of number-one R&B albums of 1999 (U.S.)

References

Too Short albums
1999 albums
Albums produced by Ant Banks
Jive Records albums